The 1983–84 DFB-Pokal was the 41st season of the annual German football cup competition. It began on 16 August 1983 and ended on 31 May 1984. In the final Bayern Munich defeated Borussia Mönchengladbach 8–7 on penalties to take their seventh title. It was the first time the cup final was decided by a penalty shootout. Controversy raged after the penalty shoot out. Lothar Matthäus was playing his last game for Moenchengladbach before his big Summer move to Bayern. He stepped up to take the first penalty for Borussia and missed. Loyal Borussia fans claimed foul. This was later denied by Matthäus.

Matches

First round

Replays

Second round

Round of 16

Replays

Quarter-finals

Replay

Semi-finals

Final

References

External links
 Official site of the DFB 
 Kicker.de 

1983-84
1983–84 in German football cups